The rotund rocksnail, scientific name †Leptoxis ligata, was a species of gastropod in the family Pleuroceridae.

This species was endemic to the United States. It is now extinct.

References

Leptoxis
Extinct gastropods
Gastropods described in 1860
Taxonomy articles created by Polbot